Deto is a genus of woodlice in the family Detonidae. Members of this genus can be found along the coasts in areas of New Zealand, Namibia, South Africa and Australia.

Species 
As of 2019, five species of Deto are accepted by the World Register of Marine Species. Additionally, one species, Deto spinicornis, is listed as nomen dubium.

 Deto aucklandiae (Thomson, 1879)
 Deto bucculenta (Nicolet, 1849)
 Deto echinata Guérin-Méneville, 1836
 Deto marina (Chilton, 1885)
 Deto whitei Kinahan, 1859

References 

Isopoda